The Supermarine Sea Lions were a series of flying boats built for the Schneider Trophy race.

Supermarine Sea Lion I, competing for the 1919 Schneider Trophy
Supermarine Sea Lion II, winner of the 1922 Schneider Trophy
Supermarine Sea Lion III, the Sea Lion II fitted with a different engine for the 1923 Schneider Trophy

Flying boats